This is a list of notable events relating to the environment in 1982. They relate to environmental law, conservation, environmentalism and environmental issues.

Events

April
The Convention for the Conservation of Antarctic Marine Living Resources entered into force.

June
The Convention on the Conservation of European Wildlife and Natural Habitats, also known as the Bern Convention, came into force.

November
The Agreed Measures for the Conservation of Antarctic Fauna and Flora came into effect. It expired in 2011.

See also

Human impact on the environment
List of environmental issues

References